Areas of Concern is a term used by regulatory bodies to refer to environmentally sensitive or damaged areas.

Area of Critical Environmental Concern program managed by the United States Bureau of Land Management
Great Lakes Areas of Concern managed under the Great Lakes Water Quality Agreement between the United States and Canada